Chryseobacterium zeae  is a Gram-negative and rod-shaped bacteria from the genus of Chryseobacterium which has been isolated from stem from a sweet corn plant (Zea mays) in Macon County in the United States.

References

Further reading

External links
Type strain of Chryseobacterium zeae at BacDive -  the Bacterial Diversity Metadatabase

zeae
Bacteria described in 2014